KTRQ is an FM radio station broadcasting on 102.3 FM, licensed to Colt, Arkansas.

The station plays an oldies format, bringing back the top performing songs of the 1950s and 1960s. The powerful 40,000 watt FM signal makes it listenable in a three state region. Memphis, Tennessee, is the largest city in its primary coverage area. The station is the home of the long-running "Pig and Whistle Show" which airs Sunday nights with legendary disc jockey Alex Ward.

KTRQ was originally a 3,000 watt station in Brinkley, Arkansas before its parent company East Arkansas Broadcasters opted to move the tower just outside Forrest City, Arkansas allowing the signal to be significantly upgraded.

External links

TRQ
Oldies radio stations in the United States
Radio stations established in 1961
St. Francis County, Arkansas